Cabragh Wedge Tomb, also called Cabragh I or the Giant's Grave, is a wedge-shaped gallery grave and National Monument located in County Sligo, Ireland.

Location

A tributary of the Owenbeg River flows to the west.

History

This wedge tomb was built c. 2500–2000 BC, in the Copper or Bronze Age. The entrance faces southwest, towards the setting sun at the winter solstice.

Description

References

National Monuments in County Sligo
Archaeological sites in County Sligo
Tombs in the Republic of Ireland